Eduards Višņakovs (born 10 May 1990) is a Latvian footballer who plays as a forward for Latvian Higher League side SK Super Nova.

Club career

Early career

Born in Riga, as a youth player Višņakovs played for his local club JFC Skonto till 2003, when he moved to Daugava Rīga. Being taken to the first team in 2008, Višņakovs scored 30 goals in 30 Latvian First League appearances, becoming the top scorer of the league and helping his team clinch an automatic promotion to the Latvian Higher League. He was also named the league's best player in a ceremony on 22 December 2008.

FK Ventspils

Before the start of the 2009 Latvian Higher League season Višņakovs refused to extend his contract with Daugava, joining that time Latvian champions FK Ventspils. Right after joining Višņakovs was given out on loan to the league's newcomers FC Tranzit in order to get more experience. During this loan spell Višņakovs scored 3 goals in 19 league matches, returning from loan in August 2009. During his time at FK Ventspils, Višņakovs scored 25 goals in 74 league matches, helping the team lift all the possible trophies of the country, including Baltic League in 2010, Latvian Higher League and Latvian Cup in 2011. Višņakovs also participated in the 2009–10 UEFA Europa League group stages.

Shakhter Karagandy

In June 2012 Višņakovs moved to the Kazakhstan Premier League champions Shakhter Karagandy. He scored his first league goal for the club on 9 July 2012 in a 5–1 victory over FC Zhetysu. All in all, Višņakovs participated in 20 league matches, scoring 4 goals. He helped his team become the champions of Kazakhstan in 2012 and lift the Kazakhstan Super Cup in 2013.

Widzew Łódź

In July 2013 Višņakovs went on trial with the Polish Ekstraklasa club Widzew Łódź and signed a one-year contract with them after a successful trial. He scored both goals in a 2–1 victory over Zawisza Bydgoszcz on his debut for the club. In his second match for Widzew, Višņakovs yet again scored both goals, securing a 2–1 victory over Korona Kielce. On 18 August 2013 Višņakovs scored the only goal in a 1-0 Polish Cup 1/16 finals victory over Ursus Warszawa. On 25 August 2013 Višņakovs scored his fifth goal of the season in a 1-3 loss against Śląsk Wrocław. He scored his sixth goal of the season on 6 October 2013 in a 4-1 victory over Lechia Gdańsk. Višņakovs scored his seventh and eighth goal of the season, respectively, in a 3-1 loss to Zagłębie Lubin and a 2-1 victory over Pogoń Szczecin on 19 October and 2 November 2013. At the start of December 2013 Višņakovs extended his contract with Widzew till June 2016. All in all he scored 12 goals in 36 league matches that season and was reportedly close to a move to the German Bundesliga, while Widzew were relegated from the Ekstraklasa.

2014 transfer saga

In December 2013 it was reported that Widzew had rejected an offer of 450,000 euros for Višņakovs from the Polish champions Legia Warsaw. Having been previously linked with a possible move to either FC St. Pauli, Hamburger SV, SC Freiburg or Schalke 04, Višņakovs finally went on trial with the Russian Premier League club Torpedo Moscow in July 2014, the only team ready to pay the transfer fee requested by Widzew. Višņakovs himself stated that his priority was the German Bundesliga but that Lech Poznań, who were also interested in the player, was an alternative.

Ruch Chorzów

On 28 August 2014 Višņakovs officially moved to the Polish Ekstraklasa club Ruch Chorzów, signing a three-year contract. He made his debut for Ruch on 31 August 2014 in a 3-3 draw against Lechia Gdańsk, coming on as a substitute and scoring a goal.

International career

Eduards Višņakovs has represented Latvia at U-19 and U-21 levels. He participated and scored a goal in the U-23 friendly match against Estonia on 5 June 2013, helping his team secure a 2–0 victory. On 10 September 2013 the U-23 team beat England 1-0, with Višņakovs scoring his second goal in two matches. Višņakovs was firstly called up to Latvia national football team for the FIFA World Cup 2014 qualifying matches against Lithuania and Slovakia on 11 and 15 October 2013. He made his debut for the national team in the match against Lithuania, coming on as a substitute in the 77th minute and replacing Māris Verpakovskis. A local scandal arose when Widzew refused to fulfill its previously given promise to the Latvian Football Federation and did not allow Višņakovs to join the national team for the Baltic Cup matches in May 2014. Resentment was expressed by the Latvian Football Federation and the player himself but Latvia, eventually, went on to win the tournament without the help of Višņakovs. In September 2014, prior to the UEFA Euro 2016 qualifying match against Kazakhstan, Višņakovs revealed that while he was playing for Shakhter Karagandy he was urged to take on Kazakhstani citizenship but despite not being on the radar of Latvia national team at the time, he had declined the offers stating that he would only play internationally for Latvia.

International stats

Honours

FK Daugava Rīga
Latvijas Pirmā līga: 2008

FK Ventspils
Virslīga: 2011 
Latvian Cup: 2010–11
Baltic League: 2009–10

FC Shakhter Karagandy
Kazakh Premier League: 2012 
Kazakhstan Super Cup: 2013

Individual
Latvijas Pirmā līga top scorer: 2008 (30 goals)

Personal life

His elder brother Aleksejs is also a professional footballer. While Eduards was a part of FK Ventspils squad, they also played together. In 2013 they became the second pair of brothers to play for Widzew together after Lithuanians Artūras and Igoris Steško during the 2001-2002 season.

References

External links
 
 Profile at Soccerbase.com
 
 
 

1990 births
Living people
Footballers from Riga
Latvian people of Russian descent
Latvian footballers
Association football forwards
Latvia youth international footballers
Latvia under-21 international footballers
Latvia international footballers
Latvian expatriate footballers
Expatriate footballers in Kazakhstan
Expatriate footballers in Poland
Expatriate footballers in Belgium
Expatriate footballers in Belarus
Expatriate footballers in Romania
Latvian expatriate sportspeople in Poland
Latvian expatriate sportspeople in Belgium
Latvian expatriate sportspeople in Belarus
Latvian expatriate sportspeople in Romania
Belgian Pro League players
Ekstraklasa players
I liga players
II liga players
III liga players
FC Tranzīts players
FK Ventspils players
FC Shakhter Karagandy players
Widzew Łódź players
Ruch Chorzów players
K.V.C. Westerlo players
FK RFS players
FC Shakhtyor Soligorsk players
FK Spartaks Jūrmala players
CSM Reșița players
MKP Pogoń Siedlce players